Márcio Nascimento Rozário (born 21 November 1983) is a Brazilian footballer who plays as a center back. Since May 2019, he plays for the Brazilian club Inter de Lages.

Club career
Márcio Rozário previously played for Juventude in the Campeonato Brasileiro. He was hired by the UAE side Al-Jazira in 2008 at the request of the coach Abel Braga. In July 2010, he left UAE after two seasons with the Al-Jazira.

On 2 August 2010, Márcio Rozário signed a one-year contract with Botafogo. Next year, he moved to Fluminense which was managed by Abel Braga on 26 May. In August 2012, Márcio Rozário signed a two-year contract with CS Marítimo.

References

1983 births
Living people
Brazilian footballers
Brazilian expatriate footballers
Esporte Clube Juventude players
Al Jazira Club players
Expatriate footballers in the United Arab Emirates
Brazilian expatriate sportspeople in the United Arab Emirates
Botafogo de Futebol e Regatas players
Sociedade Esportiva e Recreativa Caxias do Sul players
América Futebol Clube (RN) players
Fluminense FC players
Clube Náutico Capibaribe players
Campeonato Brasileiro Série A players
C.S. Marítimo players
Esporte Clube Internacional de Lages players
Primeira Liga players
Expatriate footballers in Portugal
Brazilian expatriate sportspeople in Portugal
Marcio Rozario
Expatriate footballers in Thailand
Brazilian expatriate sportspeople in Thailand
Marcio Rozario
Sportspeople from Espírito Santo
UAE Pro League players
Association football defenders